The Cheyenne County Courthouse, located at 212 E. Washington St. in St. Francis, Kansas was built during 1924–25. It was designed by Thomas W. Williamson & Co. and built by Thomas D. Howard. It was built in Classical Revival style. It was listed on the National Register of Historic Places in 2002.

It was deemed significant for association with architect Thomas W. Williamson and for association with other county courthouses in Kansas that he designed.

References

Courthouses on the National Register of Historic Places in Kansas
Neoclassical architecture in Kansas
Government buildings completed in 1924
Cheyenne County, Kansas
County courthouses in Kansas
National Register of Historic Places in Cheyenne County, Kansas